is a Japanese writer and politician. She served four terms in the House of Councillors, the upper house of the national Diet, from 1986 until 2010. Her husband is Heisuke Hironaka, a mathematician.

Politician
Hironaka was first elected to the House of Councillors from the national proportional representation block at the 1986 election as a member of the Komeito party. She was re-elected to a second term as a national PR member at the 1992 election. Between 1993-1994, she was State Minister, Director-General of the Environment Agency in the Hosokawa Cabinet.

Following the breakup of Komeito in 1994, Hironaka was part of the group that formed the New Frontier Party, which itself dissolved in 1997. She contested the Chiba at-large district as an independent at the 1998 election, winning one of the district's two seats. She subsequently joined the Democratic Party of Japan and served as one of the party's vice presidents on several occasions. Hironaka won a second term as a Councillor for Chiba at the 2004 election, this time as an official DPJ candidate. At the July 2010 election, Chiba's representation was expanded to three seats, however the 76 year-old Hironaka was replaced as a DPJ candidate by the younger Hiroyuki Konishi and Ayumi Michi, who finished first and fourth in the ballot respectively. Hironaka contested the election from the national PR block. She was listed 39th on the DPJ's party ticket in the contest for 48 seats, making it realistically impossible for her to retain a seat. The party received enough votes for 16 seats in the election, ending Hironaka's career in the Diet.

During her time in the Diet, Hironaka also served as Director of the Research Committee on International Affairs and Global Warming Issues and a Member of both the Committee on Environment and Official Development Assistance and Related Matters. She has been active internationally, as Vice Chair of Global Environmental Action (GEA), an organizing member of Micro Credit Summit, a member of World Commission on Forests and Sustainable Development, Earth Charter Commission, and Teri (The Energy and Resourceｓ Institute)

Hironaka received a B.A. in English from Ochanomizu Women's University and an M.A. in Anthropology from Brandeis University. She has written several books, essays, translations, and critiques on education, culture, society, and women's issues.

Other activities
Party Affiliation and Position Standing
Officer, Democratic Party of Japan
Membership, House Committees Chair, Research Committee on Economy, Industry and Employment
Member, Committee on Education, Culture, and Science.
Membership, International Organizations Vice-Chair, Global Environmental Action (GEA)
Vice-Chair, GLOBE Japan (Global Legislators Organization for a Balanced Environment)
Co-Chair, Council of Parliamentarians, Micro Credit Summit
Member, WCFSD (World Commission on Forests and Sustainable Development)
Member, Earth Charter Commission
Member, Earth Charter International Council
Chair, Committee for Promoting the Earth Charter in Japan and the Asia Pacific
Member, International Scientific Advisory Board (ISAB), UNESCO
Chair, PGA (Parliamentarians for Global Action) Japan National Committee
Member, Governing Council, TERI The Energy Research Institute, New Delhi, India
Member, UNEP Sasakawa Prize Jury

Former Roles
Sept. 2005 – Sept. 2006: Vice President, Democratic Party of Japan
June 1996 - Jan. 1997: Chairperson, House Special Committee on Science and Technology
Aug. 1995 - June 1996: Shadow Cabinet Minister of Environment Policy, New Frontier Party Aug.
1993 - Apr. 1994: State Minister, Director General of the Environment Agency
Apr. 1993 - Aug. 1993: President, GLOBE Japan (Global Legislators Organization for a Balanced Environment)

Bibliography
In Japanese
 1979
 1981
 1982
 1987
 1989

Translations into Japanese
Shifting Gears, George & Nina O'Neill, 1975
Japan as Number One, Ezra Vogel with A. Kimoto, 1979
Samurai & Silk, Haru M. Reischauer, 1987

Translations from Japanese to English
 : Sawako Ariyoshi, 1978 (with Ann Siller Kostant)
Ameyuki-san, Tomoko Yamazaki, 1986

References

External links
 Official website

Government ministers of Japan
Members of the House of Councillors (Japan)
Women government ministers of Japan
Female members of the House of Councillors (Japan)
Japanese writers
Brandeis University alumni
People from Tokyo
Living people
1934 births
Democratic Party of Japan politicians